Ame no Hohi (アメノホヒ, "Heavenly grain sun") is a male deity and the second son of sun goddess Amaterasu in Japanese mythology. Kokusō is said to have originated from Ame no Hohi. He was also said to be the ancestor to Izumo rulers.

Mythology 

In some myths he was sent first to earth to rule after his brother Ame-no-oshihomimi refused the offer. However, when he didn't return after three years they sent another god to rule.

Family 
Ame no Hohi's sons are called the Ame-no-Hinadori and Takehi-Nateru. Ame no Hohi is believed to be the ancestor of the Izumo no Omi. As well as the priests of Izumo and the Sugawara clan. Nomi no Sukune is said to be the decedent of Amenohohi.

Worship 
Tagata jinja is a shrine dedicated to Ame no Hohi. He is also said to be enshrined at Kameido Tenjin Shrine.

References 

Japanese gods
Amatsukami